Coychurch Lower is a community in Bridgend County Borough, South Wales. Along with the communities of Brackla and Bridgend, it makes up the town of Bridgend. Coychurch Lower is the eastern district of Bridgend, and takes in the village of Coychurch and the area known as Waterton. Traffic leaving the M4 Motorway for Bridgend at Junction 35 travels through Coychurch Lower along the A473 road, passing through an area of business parks and out-of town shopping zones, which takes up the majority of the western half of the community. The population of Coychurch Lower at the 2001 census was 1206, increasing to 1,365 at the 2011 census.

The community of Coychurch Lower was created in 1974 when the civil parishes of Wales were abolished. In 1996, in a major change to the boundaries of Bridgend, Coychurch Lower gained much of the community of Ewenny and Llangan.

Landmarks
Coychurch Lower has several buildings of note. In the village of Coychurch is the church of St. Crallo, one of the largest churches in Glamorgan. Thought to be built on the site of a Celtic clas, St Crallo is a 13th-century cruciform church, described by English historian Edward Augustus Freeman as making "an admiral model for a small colonial cathedral". The church has undergone several restorations, including interior work in 1871 by John Prichard and a reconstruction of the south transept in 1888 by F.R. Kempson. St Crallo's also contains several monuments, including a 14th-century figure of a praying monk and a memorial to Welsh lexicographer Thomas Richards.

Also in Coychurch is the Mid Glamorgan Crematorium, one of the last commissions of Maxwell Fry. The building is notable for its stained glass windows, described as one of the most important recent displays in the county. Other buildings of note include the headquarters of the South Wales Police and Coed-y-Mwstwr, a 19th-century country house in the Tudor style.

Notes

External links
Map showing the community boundaries of Coychurch Lower

Bridgend
Communities in Bridgend County Borough